Charles Arthur Richardson Oliver (actually registered as "Charles Arthur Sherlock Oliver"; 21 June 1907, in Buttevant, County Cork, Ireland – 29 March 1983, in Tunbridge Wells, Kent, England) was a British film actor. He married on 4 June 1938 the actress (Margaret) Noel Hood. They had two children: Nina (1943) and William (1947). He appeared in the Will Hay film Ask a Policeman as the local squire who oversees a smuggling empire.

Television

Selected filmography
 Beloved Imposter (1936) – Pierre
 The Avenging Hand (1936) – Toni Visetti
 Wings Over Africa (1936) – Collins
 Second Bureau (1936) – Paul Benoit
 Midnight at Madame Tussaud's (1936) – Harry Newton
 Fifty-Shilling Boxer (1937) – Jim Pollett
 The Green Cockatoo (1937) – Terrell – Gang Boss
 If I Were Boss (1938) – Owen Reeves
 The Drum (1938) – Rajab
 The Lady Vanishes (1938) – The Officer
 Hey! Hey! USA (1938) – Curly (uncredited)
 Sexton Blake and the Hooded Terror (1938) – Max Fleming
 Mountains O'Mourne (1938) – Errol Finnegan
 Life of St. Paul (1938) – Elder
 Ask a Policeman (1939) – The Squire
 The Saint in London (1939) – Dr. Jim – Templar's Friend (uncredited)
 This Man in Paris (1939) – Gaston
 Band Waggon (1940) – Saboteur (uncredited)
 Night Train to Munich (1940) – SS Officer at Concentration Camp (uncredited)
 Under Your Hat (1940) – Carl
 Three Silent Men (1940) – Johnson
 Inspector Hornleigh Goes to It (1941) – Dr. Wilkinson
 Crook's Tour (1941) – Sheik (final film role)

References

External links

British male film actors
20th-century British male actors
1907 births
1983 deaths
People from County Cork